Brigitta Sipőcz is a Hungarian astronomer and discoverer of minor planets.

Sipőcz works as a researcher at the University of Hertfordshire in the United Kingdom. At the time she was searching for the transit of M dwarfs.

The Minor Planet Center credits her with the discovery of 35 minor planets, all made in collaboration with Krisztián Sárneczky in 2003.

List of discovered minor planets

References 
 

Discoverers of minor planets

20th-century Hungarian astronomers
Women astronomers
Living people
Year of birth missing (living people)